S N Sethuram is a Kannada TV serial actor, director, playwright and writer.

He says he has been inspired by authors like Leo Tolstoy, Nikolai Gogol, Aleksandr Puskin, Anton Chekov and other Russian authors.

Works

Serials
Mayamruga - Actor
Manthana - Director and Actor
  Anavarana serial - Director and Actor
  Dibbana - Director and Actor
  Yugantara - Director and Actor

Dramas
 Nimitta (2013)
 Gati (2014) 
 Atheeta (2014) 
 Uchchista (2019-Sep-26)
 Sthree (2021-Feb-10)

Films 

 Stabiliti (2021)

Awards
 Maasti award - 2017

Literary Works
 Nimittha Gathi - 2017
 Navalla - 2017
 Dahana - 2018
All books

References

Living people
Indian television directors
Kannada people
1953 births